Triisopropylamine is an organic chemical compound consisting of three isopropyl groups bound to a central nitrogen atom. As a hindered tertiary amine, it can be used as a non-nucleophilic base and as a stabilizer for polymers; however, its applications are limited by its relatively high cost and difficult synthesis.

Structure
Triisopropylamine is notable as being among the most sterically hindered amines currently known. The even more crowded tri-tert-butylamine (tBu3N) has never been synthesized, although ab initio quantum chemical computations as well as the existence of the even more crowded 2,2,4,4-tetramethyl-3-t-butyl-pentane-3-ol (tri-tert-butylcarbinol, tBu3COH) implies that it should be a stable molecule if it could be prepared.  To date, di-tert-butyl(isopropyl)amine (tBu2iPrN) has been prepared in low yield, as have a handful of tri-tert-alkylamines in which two of the tert-alkyl groups are tied together in a ring, but the authors of a 2018 study predict that tBu3N will likely remain a longstanding unsolved synthetic challenge.

In the early 1990s, theoretical studies and electron diffraction analysis of the 3D structure of the molecule, in the gas phase or in non-polar solvents, indicated that the bonds between the nitrogen atom and the three carbon atoms were nearly coplanar in the ground state, instead of forming a trigonal pyramid as in simpler amines.  The average C-N-C angle was claimed to be 119.2°, much closer to the 120° of the flat configuration than to the 111.8° of trimethylamine.  This peculiarity was attributed to steric hindrance by the bulky isopropyl radicals.  However, in 1998  X-ray diffraction analysis of the crystallized solid showed that the C3N core is actually pyramidal, with the N atom lying approximately 0.28 Å off the carbons' plane (whereas in trimethylamine the distance is about 0.45 Å). However the researchers could not rule out the crystal field effect as the cause of the asymmetry.

The C-C-C planes of the isopropyl groups are slightly tilted (about 5°) relative to the threefold symmetry axis of the C3N core.

Preparation
Steric effects make triisopropylamine difficult to synthesise and unlike less hindered tertiary amines (such as triethylamine) it cannot be produced by the alkylation of ammonia with alcohol; attempts to do so stall at diisopropylamine. It can be prepared from diisopropylamine on the laboratory scale:

Industrial synthesis involves the reaction of ammonia with propylene oxide followed by hydrogenation.

See also 

 Tetra-tert-butylethylene

References

Non-nucleophilic bases
Diisopropylamino compounds
Tertiary amines